Beautiful and Wild on Ibiza (German: Die schönen Wilden von Ibiza) is a 1980 West German comedy film directed by Sigi Rothemund and starring Régis Porte, Margit Geissler and Michael Gspandl.

Cast
 Régis Porte as Mike 
 Tanja Spiess as Susi 
 Michael Gspandl as Poldi 
 Beate Gränitz as Gilda 
 Margit Geissler as Nadja 
 Gesa Thoma as Ajita 
 Heidi Stroh as Muschi 
 Jan Hopmann as Juppy 
 Karl Heinz Maslo as Bob 
 Rafael Molina as Bosso
 Michael Spiess
 Manel Aragones
 Jean Henké
 Carlos "Carla" Delgardo

References

Bibliography
 Roman Schliesser & Leo Moser. Die Supernase: Karl Spiehs und seine Filme. Ueberreuter, 2006.

External links 
 

1980 films
1980s sex comedy films
German sex comedy films
West German films
1980s German-language films
Films directed by Sigi Rothemund
Films set in Ibiza
Films about vacationing
1980 comedy films
1980s German films